Baron Hamilton of Hameldon, of Hambledon in the County of Leicester, is a title in the Peerage of Great Britain, held by the Duke of Hamilton from 1790 to 1799 and by the Duke of Argyll since 1799.

It was created in 1776 for Elizabeth Gunning (Duchess of Hamilton), wife since 1752 of James Douglas-Hamilton, 6th Duke of Hamilton. The Duke of Hamilton died in 1758, and his widow remarried the following year, to John Campbell, who later became Marquess of Lorne in 1761 and 5th Duke of Argyll in 1770. She died in 1790, and her Barony passed to her only surviving son from her first marriage, the 8th Duke of Hamilton. On his death without male issue, the barony passed to his half-brother the Marquess of Lorne, the Duchess's eldest surviving son by her second marriage. Lord Lorne succeeded his father as 6th Duke of Argyll in 1806, and the Barony of Hamilton has since remained united with that title.

The arms of Elizabeth Gunning, Baroness Hamilton of Hameldon, were her paternal arms of Gunning augmented with a fess ermine and ducal crowns for the doves: Gules, on a fess ermine between three doves argent ducally crowned or as many crosses pattée of the first.

Barons Hamilton of Hameldon (1776)
Elizabeth Campbell, 1st Baroness Hamilton of Hameldon (1733–1790)
Douglas Douglas-Hamilton, 8th Duke of Hamilton, 2nd Baron Hamilton of Hameldon (1756–1799)
George William Campbell, 6th Duke of Argyll, 3rd Baron Hamilton of Hameldon (1768–1839)

see Duke of Argyll for further succession.

Family tree

References

Noble titles created in 1776
Baronies in the Peerage of Great Britain
Clan Campbell